Preston University is a private for-profit unaccredited institution that offers a variety of academic degree programs by distance learning.  Preston was originally based in Wyoming and in 2007 was based in Alabama. As of 2012, Preston identified Los Angeles, California as its base of operations.

Preston University is owned by Dr. Abdul Basit.

About 30 affiliated campuses throughout the world were listed by Preston.  A number of degree programs ranging from associate to Ph.D. in a variety of disciplines were offered. As of August 2012, the Oregon Office of Degree Authorization reported that the university was operated from Pakistan, had formerly operated in Wyoming and Alabama in the United States, had been active in Nepal in 2009, also had a presence in Dubai, and used several different institutional names in several world regions.

History

Preston University states that it was established in 1984 and that its first United States campus was established in 1994. As of 1998, the school was based in Cheyenne, Wyoming, and operated additional campuses in Africa and Asia, including four campuses in Karachi and two in other parts of Pakistan. At that time there were 30 full-time faculty and 30 part-time instructors working in Cheyenne, but most of Preston's revenue came from the campuses in Pakistan.

Preston faced challenges in 1998 when the U.S. government imposed trade embargoes on Pakistan in 1998 after that nation tested nuclear weapons, but by 2001, Preston's chancellor, Jerry Haenisch, told the Chronicle of Higher Education that Preston had 30 "affiliated" campuses in 19 countries and about 8,000 students, mostly in Pakistan. Preston offered classroom instruction in Cheyenne as well as distance education. As of 2001, about 18 students were reported to be taking classes at what was then Preston's official main campus in Cheyenne.

In 2001, The Chronicle of Higher Education reported that it had randomly selected two of Preston University's listed faculty members and inquired about their relationship with the university.  They both said that they were not associated with Preston University and did not know that they were on the school's faculty list. A Preston official acknowledged that only 15 out of 49 listed faculty actually worked for the university. Haenisch explained that over half of the faculty on their list had applied for jobs at Preston but had never actually been employed. They were listed in case a student was interested in the discipline the professor specialized in. Haenisch admitted that the practice was misleading and would be discontinued.

In 2005, Haenisch said he was hoping the Wyoming legislature would pass laws that would allow the setting up an international accrediting agency to allow for expansion of Preston's as well as other schools online enrollment and bring more students to Wyoming; State Superintendent Jim McBride said he was opposed to any such law. Haenisch had also voiced his concern about the potential for illegitimate or degree mill-type schools being licensed in the state of Wyoming.

Move to Alabama
In 2007, the state of Wyoming started requiring that higher education institutions operating in the state must be accredited. Because Preston remained unaccredited it moved its operations to Alabama.

In February 2008 the Preston University website listed at least 30 affiliated campuses.

In August 2008, The Straits Times reported that Preston University was a degree mill from which some leading businessmen in Singapore held PhD degrees. The Straits Times assertions about Preston were strongly disputed by Jerry Haenisch, Preston's chancellor, who confirmed that the university had no accreditation from any US Department of Education approved body but said that the school was "absolutely not" a "degree mill". Haenisch said that careless inclusion of Preston University in the sensational reporting about degree mills is inexcusable and demanded that the newspaper apologize for publishing articles based on superficial research and for repeating erroneous assumptions and untrue innuendo from other writers. He said that the university was "legally licensed and authorized to operate by the state of Alabama". Finally he took issue with The Straits Times statement that the move from Wyoming to Alabama was a sign of disrepute. He said the move was made because Alabama is more populated than Wyoming and has much greater support resources. He also pointed out that the US Department of Education and the Council for Higher Education Accreditation both state the voluntary nature of accreditation in the country, and caution that a school's accreditation status should not be the sole criterion for assessing its quality or validity. The Straits Times responded, "The Straits Times ... made it clear that it was not about to apologise to Preston University for telling its readers the truth about its credentials – or rather, its lack of. Said Editor Han Fook Kwang: 'We stand by our story and am satisfied that our journalist was accurate in her reporting of Preston University'."

Preston University's license to operate legally in Alabama expired on December 1, 2008. On February 6, 2009, Preston University was ordered to cease and desist operations by the State of Alabama for failing many of the standards enacted for educational institutions in that state. The rules set by the Alabama Chancellor of Education, effective on October 1, 2008, require all private schools to become accredited. Section IV, B, 3, a, 4. states:  “All privately licensed degree granting, post-secondary educational institutions must be accredited by an accrediting agency recognized by the United States Department of Education (USDE), the Council for Higher Education Accreditation (CHEA), be a candidate for accreditation or in process of application for accreditation as determined and monitored by the Department. This requirement becomes effective beginning October 1, 2008 for any degree granting institutions applying for initial or renewal licensure.”  The Alabama Department of PostSecondary Education rejection letter to Preston states that "during the on-site visits, it was determined that the location for the institution is based out of a virtual office setting which is not staffed properly nor has operating equipment." Also, "The admissions policies are not rigorous and are unacceptable."  Also, "All assessment decisions are based on a fee for diploma rather than class attendance, lecture participation and projects...", and finally "Evidence has been received by the Department that Preston University issues Honorary Degrees for a fee." The letter did not mention what evidence had actually been received and appears to be in contradiction with Preston University's website which states that the Academic Program Coordinator would recommend award of the appropriate degree only when the following requirements have been met:

 satisfactory completion of all course work;
 completion of an approved project, thesis or dissertation, if required;
 full payment of all tuition, fees and costs;
 written approval of the supervising professor; (Doctoral degrees only)

Move to California
Preston University moved its headquarters to Los Angeles, California in 2009.

In December 2011 the California Bureau for Private Postsecondary Education (BPPE) denied Preston University's application to operate in California and in May 2012 it issued a "statement of issues" where it asked that Preston's "Application for Approval to Operate an Institution Not Accredited" be denied by the Director of the California Department of Consumer Affairs on the basis of "incomplete application". A number of reasons were given in the BPPE's statement about this incomplete application, including Preston University's failure to provide the bureau with pertinent information about "cease and desist" orders it had received in the states of Wyoming and Alabama, as well as insufficient information about the institution's education programs and resources. As of September 2012, the Preston University website stated that the school had established its world headquarters in Los Angeles and was registered as a private post-secondary education institutional business in the state of California and the city of Los Angeles. It states it is applying to the "Board of [sic] Private Postsecondary Education (BPPE)...for an official license to operate" and "will continue to serve its alumni and graduates with transcript service, degree certification, and record keeping" during the BPPE review process.

In December 2016, Preston University's website stated that it no longer offered enrollment in academic programs in its distance education division and that the university had ceased operations in the USA. However, past students and graduates who required copies of diplomas, official transcripts, and certifications could contact the Registrar's Office.

Fairmount International University

After Preston moved from Wyoming to Alabama in 2007, Preston chancellor Jerry Haenisch announced that a new distance education school, Fairmount International University, would offer an online business program from Preston's former Cheyenne offices. Preston and Fairmount were both to be owned by Abdul Basit, who served as president of both institutions, and Jerry Haenisch would serve as chancellor of both. However, Fairmount International University was not established and does not operate in Wyoming.

See also
Preston University, Pakistan

References

External links 
 
 Official website from February 2008

Distance education institutions based in the United States
Unaccredited institutions of higher learning in California